George Hodson was a baseball pitcher.

George Hodson may also refer to:

George Hodson (priest) (1788–1855), Archdeacon of Stafford 1829–1855
George Stacey Hodson (1899–1976), English World War I flying ace
Sir George Frederick John Hodson, 3rd Baronet (1806–1888) of the Hodson baronets

See also
Hodson (disambiguation)